is an anime created by Tatsunoko Productions. Thomas is a cunning bird who sponges on Kaba, the good-natured hippopotamus. Although Thomas is a dependent, living in Hyppo's big mouth, he always acts lordly and tries to outsmart his simpleminded host. However, their basic friendship and cooperation endures despite their frequent quarrels. In the 1990s, it was dubbed into English as The Wacky World of Tic & Tac from Saban Entertainment. It was also part of Tic Tac Toons, a package series in where the anime was paired with Tamagon the Counselor (dubbed as Eggzavier the Eggasaurus).

Characters
Totto/Thomas

Kaba / Hyppo

References

External links
 

1971 anime television series debuts
Animated duos
Animated television series about birds
Animated television series about mammals
Comedy anime and manga
Fictional hippopotamuses
Fuji TV original programming
Tatsunoko Production
Television duos